The 2009 FIA GT Adria 2 Hours is the second round of the 2009 FIA GT Championship season.  It took place at the Adria International Raceway, Italy, on 16 May 2009.

Report

Qualifying
The #14 K plus K Motorsports Saleen initially qualified on pole position, but was disqualified for failing technical inspection.  The #77 BMS Scuderia Italia Ferrari was also disqualified.

Qualifying result
Class winners are highlighted in bold.

Race

Race result
Class winners in bold.  Cars failing to complete 75% of winner's distance marked as Not Classified (NC).

References

Adria
FIA GT Adria